The 2022 US Open – Men's singles qualifying is a series of tennis matches that took place from August 23 to 26, 2022 to determine the sixteen qualifiers into the main draw of the men's singles tournament, and, if necessary, the lucky losers.

This was the final Grand Slam appearance of two-time major quarterfinalist Gilles Simon. He lost in the second round.

Seeds

Qualifiers

Lucky losers
The lucky losers draw was made among the four players with the highest ranking losing in the qualifying competition: Franco Agamenone, Corentin Moutet, Hugo Grenier and Fernando Verdasco. The LL order drawn was Corentin Moutet, Fernando Verdasco, Hugo Grenier and Franco Agamenone.

Qualifying draw

First qualifier

Second qualifier

Third qualifier

Fourth qualifier

Fifth qualifier

Sixth qualifier

Seventh qualifier

Eighth qualifier

Ninth qualifier

Tenth qualifier

Eleventh qualifier

Twelfth qualifier

Thirteenth qualifier

Fourteenth qualifier

Fifteenth qualifier

Sixteenth qualifier

References

External links
  Men's singles qualifying draw

Men's singles qualifying
US Open (tennis) by year – Qualifying